Think All, Focus One is an album by Muhal Richard Abrams which was released on the Italian Black Saint label in 1995 and features performances of seven of Abrams' compositions by Abrams, Eddie Allen, David Gilmore, Eugene Ghee, Alfred Patterson, Brad Jones, and Reggie Nicholson.

Reception
The Allmusic review by Scott Yanow states "Due to the frequently dense ensembles of the septet and the complexity of the music, this set will take several listens to fully absorb, but it is well worth the effort". The Penguin Guide to Jazz awarded the album 3½ stars calling it "fine, thoroughly thought jazz".

Track listing
All compositions by Muhal Richard Abrams
 "Before and After" - 8:37  
 "The Harmonic Veil" - 6:23  
 "Crossbeams" - 8:42  
 "The Junction" - 8:33  
 "Scaledance" - 5:55  
 "Encore" - 12:46  
 "Think All, Focus One" - 5:36  
Recorded on July 15 & 16, 1994 at East Side Sound, NYC

Personnel
Eddie Allen: trumpet
Eugene Ghee: tenor saxophone, bass clarinet
Alfred Patterson: trombone
David Gilmore: guitar
Brad Jones: bass
Reggie Nicholson: drums
Muhal Richard Abrams: piano, synthesizer

References

1995 albums
Muhal Richard Abrams albums
Black Saint/Soul Note albums